Green Lantern refers to a group of fictional superheroes in DC Comics. Green Lantern may also refer to:
 Green Lantern (comic book)
 Green Lantern (film), a 2011 American live-action superhero film directed by Martin Campbell
 Green Lantern (soundtrack), a soundtrack album from the 2011 film
 Green Lantern: Rise of the Manhunters, a video game tie-in to the 2011 film
 Green Lantern: The Animated Series, a CGI television series that aired on Cartoon Network
 Green Lantern Corps, a fictional intergalactic military/police force appearing in comics published by DC Comics
 Green Lantern (Six Flags Great Adventure), a stand-up roller coaster at Six Flags Great Adventure in Jackson Township, New Jersey, United States
 Green Lantern: First Flight (Six Flags Magic Mountain), a 4th Dimension roller coaster at Six Flags Magic Mountain in Valencia, California, United States
 Green Lantern Coaster, the steepest roller coaster in the Southern Hemisphere, located at Warner Bros. Movie World on the Gold Coast, Queensland, Australia
 DJ Green Lantern, a hip-hop DJ and music producer, born James D'Agostino

See also
 Green Lantern in other media